A list of films produced in Japan ordered by year in the 2000s.  For an A-Z of films see :Category:Japanese films.

2000
Japanese films of 2000

2001
Japanese films of 2001

2002
Japanese films of 2002

2003
Japanese films of 2003

2004
Japanese films of 2004

2005
Japanese films of 2005

2006
Japanese films of 2006

2007
Japanese films of 2007

2008
Japanese films of 2008

2009
Japanese films of 2009

External links
 Japanese film at the Internet Movie Database

2000s
Japanese